Erich Kull (6 January 1932 – 9 January 1985) was a Swiss speed skater. He competed in two events at the 1956 Winter Olympics.

References

External links
 

1932 births
1985 deaths
Swiss male speed skaters
Olympic speed skaters of Switzerland
Speed skaters at the 1956 Winter Olympics
Place of birth missing